The Texans–Titans rivalry is a professional American football rivalry in the National Football League (NFL) between the Houston Texans and Tennessee Titans.

The Texans–Titans rivalry is an intense rivalry, pitting the Tennessee Titans (formerly based in Houston as the Houston Oilers) with Houston's present-day team, the Texans. The 2002 expansion and conference realignment by the NFL put a new team into Houston. With the expansion Texans in place, the NFL's realignment created the AFC South and put the two teams together as division rivals. During the 2000s, the Titans dominated the rivalry before the Texans would gain the upperhand in the 2010s. The Titans currently lead the series 23–19. The two teams have not met in the postseason.

History

Origins
The roots can be planted back to 1996, when the former Houston Oilers relocated to Tennessee and rebranded the franchise as the Titans in 1999. Houston was awarded a new franchise in 2002 dubbed the Texans, and fans have quarreled over who was the better team in Houston.

Another earlier roots for the rivalry is knowing that Tennessee was a common ancestral place for White Texan settlers back in the 1830s. Additionally, both states have large country music scenes.

2010s
The bitterness of the rivalry has led to fistfights between the teams during games. One notable fight was on November 28, 2010, when Texans receiver Andre Johnson and Titans cornerback Cortland Finnegan exchanged blows after a play and were ejected. The Texans won that game 20–0.

The rivalry became more competitive in 2011 as both teams were in the hunt for the division title most of the year. In Week 7, the Titans hosted the Texans in a match-up for the division lead and was the home field favorite while Houston was coming off of a 2-game losing streak. The Texans won 41–7 and went on to win the division that year. In Week 17, Houston hosted Tennessee; the Titans had to win to keep their playoff hopes alive. The Titans won on a botched two-point conversion try by the Texans, who were trying for the win. Due to the playoff scenarios, the Titans missed the playoffs. If Tennessee had qualified to play in the NFL playoffs, they would have played the Texans in the AFC Wild-Card round.

In 2018, the Texans won the AFC South at 11–5, and split with Tennessee. The Texans would play either the Titans or Colts in the upcoming Wild Card game, depending on the Sunday Night Football winner between the two. The Colts won 33–17, eliminating the Titans from the playoffs at 9-7 and setting up a wild-card match between the Texans and Colts. Had the Titans won, it would've been the first meeting in the playoffs between the two teams, similar to 2011.

In 2019, the Texans Week 15 road game against Titans marked the first time that both teams were 8–5 at the same time. The Texans beat the Titans 24–21, and in Week 16 the Texans won the AFC South after beating the Tampa Bay Buccaneers 23–20. In the final week of regular season, the Titans faced the Texans on the road. The Titans needed to win the game or a Pittsburgh Steelers loss against the Baltimore Ravens in order to make the playoffs. Behind a 211-yard, three-touchdown day from running back Derrick Henry and the Texans resting starters, the Titans won 35–14 to clinch the sixth seed in the playoffs.

2020s
The most competitive games in the history of the rivalry came in 2020.  On October 18 the Texans traveled to Nissan Stadium under interim coach Romeo Crennel, taking over for the fired Bill O'Brien.  The Texans erased a 21–7 gap to lead 36–29, but the Titans stormed down and scored with seven seconds left.  In overtime the Titans got first possession and advanced 82 yards on six plays ending in a direct snap touchdown run by Derrick Henry. In the second meeting of the 2020 season, Sam Sloman kicked a 37-yard field goal that bounced off the right upright and in to give Tennessee the 41–38 win. This was the highest-scoring game (79 points) in the history of the rivalry after the previous game set the record at 78 points.

Season-by-season results

|-
| 
| style="| 
| style="| Titans  13–3
| style="| Titans  17–10
| Titans  2–0
| Texans join the NFL as an expansion team.  Both teams placed in the AFC South following 2002 NFL realignment.  Titans make first return to Houston since leaving as the Oilers in 1996.
|-
| 
| style="| 
| style="| Titans  27–24
| style="| Titans  38–17
| Titans  4–0
| 
|-
| 
| style="| 
| style="| Texans  31–21
| style="| Texans  20–10
| Titans  4–2
| Texans sweep the Titans for the first time.
|-
| 
| style="| 
| style="| Titans  34–20
| style="| Titans  13–10
| Titans  6–2
| Titans go 4–12 on the season and Texans go 2–14, resulting in top-3 Draft picks for each team
|-
| 
| style="| 
| style="| Titans  26–20(OT)
| style="| Titans  28–22
| Titans  8–2
| 
|-
| 
| style="| 
| style="| Titans  38–36
| style="| Titans  31–28
| Titans  10–2
| 
|-
| 
| Tie 1–1
| style="| Texans  13–12
| style="| Titans  31–12
| Titans  11–3
| Titans win 7 straight meetings (2005–08)
|-
| 
| Tie 1–1
| style="| Titans  20–17
| style="| Texans  34–31
| Titans  12–4
| 
|-

|-
| 
| Tie 1–1
| style="| Texans  20–0
| style="| Titans  31–17
| Titans  13–5
| Cortland Finnegan, Andre Johnson fight at game in Houston
|-
| 
| Tie 1–1
| style="| Titans  23–22
| style="| Texans  41–7
| Titans  14–6
| 
|-
| 
| style="| 
| style="| Texans  38–14
| style="| Texans  24–10
| Titans  14–8
|
|-
| 
| Tie 1–1
| style="| Texans  30–24(OT)
| style="| Titans  16–10
| Titans  15–9
| 
|-
| 
| style="| 
| style="| Texans  45–21
| style="| Texans  30–16
| Titans  15–11
|
|-
| 
| style="| 
| style="| Texans  20–6
| style="| Texans  34–6
| Titans  15–13
| 
|-
| 
| Tie 1–1
| style="| Texans  27–20
| style="| Titans  24–17
| Titans  16–14
| 
|-
| 
| Tie 1–1
| style="| Texans  57–14
| style="| Titans  24–13
| Titans  17–15
| Texans' 57–14 win is the biggest blowout in the series history (43 points)
|-
| 
| Tie 1–1
| style="| Texans  34–17
| style="| Titans  20–17
| Titans  18–16
| 
|-
| 
| Tie 1–1
| style="| Titans  35–14
| style="| Texans  24–21
| Titans  19–17
| Titans clinch final AFC Wild Card berth in their away win in week 17.
|-

|-
| 
| style="| 
| style="| Titans  41–38
| style="| Titans  42–36(OT)
| Titans  21–17
| Titans clinch AFC South in Houston in week 17. First time since 2007 that the Titans swept the Texans. Two highest-scoring games in rivalry
|-
| 
| Tie 1–1
| style="| Titans  28–25
| style="| Texans  22–13
| Titans  22–18
| Titans clinch AFC's top seed with win in Houston.
|-
| 
| Tie 1–1
| style="| Titans  17–10
| style="| Texans  19–14
| Titans  23–19
|
|- 

|-
| Regular season
| style="|Titans 23–19
| Titans 11–10 
| Titans 12–9
|  
|-

References

External links
 Texans-Titans head-to-head record

National Football League rivalries
2002 establishments in the United States
Titans rivalry
Texans rivalry
Tennessee Titans rivalries
Houston Texans rivalries